The 1951 Kentucky Derby was the 77th running of the Kentucky Derby. The race took place on May 5, 1951.

Full results

References

1951
Kentucky Derby
Derby
Kentucky
Kentucky Derby